Acrodonta may refer to:

 Acrodonta (lizard), a clade in the suborder Iguania
 Acrodonta (katydid), a katydid genus in the tribe Agraeciini

See also
 Acrodont, a formation of the teeth whereby the teeth are consolidated with the summit of the alveolar ridge of the jaw without sockets